Thomas Fritsch (16 January 1944 – 21 April 2021) was a German film, television and dubbing actor. He was regarded as the "Sonnyboy" in the German cinema of the 1960s, and became one of the best-known actors by his presence in television series. Later, he was the German voice of Russell Crowe, of Scar in The Lion King, and of Diego, a Smilodon, in Ice Age.

Life 
Fritsch was born in Dresden, the son of famous actor Willy Fritsch and dancer . The family moved to Hamburg after World War II. Director and actor Gustaf Gründgens encouraged the 16-year-old Thomas to become an actor. He trained at an acting school in Hamburg-Pöseldorf for three years.

He played his first film role in the 1962 Austrian Julia, Du bist zauberhaft at age 17, alongside Lilli Palmer. He was frequently featured as the cover image of the Bravo youth magazine. In 1964, he appeared in his only film together with his father, Das hab ich von Papa gelernt. He played two more times with his father, in ZDF television shows, Das gibts doch zweimal in 1965, and Andere Zeiten, andere Sitten. Die Thomas-Fritsch-Show in 1967. He had film roles in Drei Männer in Santa Cruz, Onkel Toms Hütte, and played one of the three men in the title of Drei Männer im Schnee, among many others.

In the 1970s, Fritsch appeared in the television series Der Kommissar and Derrick several times. From 1977, Fritsch appeared in a leading role in the popular series  (Three are one too many) by Barbara Noack, portraying a man in a love triangle story. It made him one of Germany's most popular actors. He also starred in the television series Rivalen der Rennbahn (1989). In 2004, he made a return to cinema when he appeared as the villainous Earl of Cockwood in Der Wixxer, a comedy which spoofed the German Edgar Wallace films of the 1960s.

Fritsch became known as a voice actor. He was the German voice of Russell Crowe in Gladiator, Master and Commander: The Far Side of the World and Proof of Life. He starred voicing Scar in the German version of The Lion King in 1994, and voiced many other animated lions as well, and Diego, a Smilodon, in Ice Age and sequels, beginning in 2002. In the 2000s, he replaced the late Joachim Kemmer as Lumiere for the "Human Again" DVD feature of Beauty and the Beast. His last role was the narrator in the 2018 children's film , an adaption of Michael Ende's Jim Button and Luke the Engine Driver.

Thomas Fritsch died on 21 April 2021 in Berlin.

Films

Actor
Fritsch played in films and television (TV) series, including:

 Adorable Julia (1962), as Roger, Julia's son
  (1962), as Jean de Wehrt
  (1963), as High school student
  (1964), as Rick Hofer
 Drei Männer in Santa Cruz (The Last Ride to Santa Cruz, 1964), as Carlos
 Das hab ich von Papa gelernt (I Learned It from Father, 1964), as Andreas Andermann
 Legend of a Gunfighter (1964), as Chris Harper
  (1965), as Pierre de Sauterne
 Onkel Toms Hütte (Uncle Tom's Cabin, 1965), as George Shelby
  (1965), as Philipp
 Das gibt's nur zweimal (1965, TV)
 Apollo Goes on Holiday (1968)
 Der Kommissar (TV series)
 Der Papierblumenmörder (episode 15) – (1970)
 Mord nach der Uhr (episode 94) – (1975)
 Drei Männer im Schnee (Three Men in the Snow) (1974)
  (1975, TV series)
 Derrick (TV series):
 Nur Aufregungen für Rohn (1975)
 Abendfrieden (1977)
 Ein Todesengel (1979)
 Der Charme der Bahamas (1986)
 Anruf in der Nacht (1986)
 Tossners Ende (1989)
  (1977, TV series)
 Rivalen der Rennbahn (1989, TV series)
  (1995)
 Rosamunde Pilcher: Federn im Wind (2004)
 Der Wixxer (2004)
 Das total verrückte Wunderauto (2006)
 Die ProSieben Märchenstunde (2006, TV series)
 Meine wunderbare Familie (2007)
 Das Wunder von Loch Ness (2008)

Voice
Fritsch voiced the following productions, among others:

 The Good, the Bad and the Ugly- Tuco (Pro 7 dub)
 Apocalypse Now (1979)
 The Three Musketeers (1993)
 The Nanny (1993–1999) – Maxwell Sheffield
 The Lion King (1994) – Scar
 Gargoyles  (1994–1996) – Goliath
 Felidae (1994)
 The Pebble and the Penguin (1995)
 Die Hard with a Vengeance (1995) – Simon Gruber
 Balto (1995) – Steele
 Mega Man  (1995–1996)
 White Squall (1996)
 Jim Button and Luke the Engine Driver (1996) – Luke
 Titanic (1997)
 Doctor Dolittle (1998)
 Lost in Space (1998)
 The Lion King II: Simba's Pride (1998) – Scar
 Das Dschungelbuch, Mowglis Abenteuer (1998)
 Rudolph the Red-Nosed Reindeer: The Movie (1999) - Slyly the fox
 Gladiator (2000) – Maximus
 Help! I'm a Fish (2000) – Joe, the pilotfish
 Thomas and the Magic Railroad (2000) – Mr. Conductor 
 Harry Potter and the Philosopher's Stone (2001) – Garrick Ollivander
 Ice Age (2002) – Diego
 Treasure Planet (2002) – Dr. Delbert Doppler
 The Cat Returns (2002)
 Raining Cats and Frogs (2003)
 Finding Nemo (2003) – Nigel
 South Park (2003) - Russell Crowe and Steven Spielberg
 Master and Commander: The Far Side of the World (2003)
 The Lord of the Rings: The Return of the King (extended edition) – (2003)
 Lemony Snicket's A Series of Unfortunate Events (2004)
 Steamboy (2005)
 Kingdom of Heaven (2005)
 Corpse Bride (2005) – Bonejangles
 Cinderella Man (2005)
 The Chronicles of Narnia: The Lion, the Witch and the Wardrobe (2005) – Aslan
 Battlestar Galactica (2006)
 Ice Age: The Meltdown (2006) – Diego
 Copying Beethoven (2006)
 Eragon (2006)
 Open Season (2006)
 Herr Figo und das Geheimnis der Perlenfabrik (2007)
 Surf's Up (2007) - Big Z
 3:10 to Yuma (2007 film) (2007) - Ben Wade
 Astérix at the Olympic Games (2007)
 Terry Pratchett's The Colour of Magic – Lord Vetinari
 Snow Buddies (2008)
 Kung Fu Panda (2008) – Tai Lung
 The Chronicles of Narnia: Prince Caspian (2008)
 The Dark Knight (2008)
 Sacred 2 (2008)
 The Incredible Hulk (2008)
 Ice Age: Dawn of the Dinosaurs (2009) – Diego
 Risen (2009)
 Diablo 3 (2012)
 Ice Age: Continental Drift (2012) - Diego
 Ice Age: Collision Course (2016) - Diego

Awards 
 1963: Bambi Award, as the best newcomer for Das schwarz-weiß-rote Himmelbett
 2002:  for Second Chance – Alles wird gut

Notes

References

External links
 
 Synchronsprecher Russell Crowe – Thomas Fritsch (in German) synchronsprecher.de 21 April 2021

1944 births
2021 deaths
German male television actors
German male film actors
German male voice actors
20th-century German male actors
21st-century German male actors
Actors from Dresden
Recipients of the Bambi (prize)